Wrightsville and Tennille Railroad Company Building is a historic building in Tennille, Georgia. It was designed by Charles E. Choate, an architect and Methodist who worked in Tennille for many years, and constructed in 1903. The brick-and-stone structure is a late 20nth century revival of Beaux arts architecture. It was added to the National Register of Historic Places on July 28, 1994.

The Wrightsville and Tennille Railroad Company Building is now a private residence.

See also
Tennille Banking Company Building
National Register of Historic Places listings in Washington County, Georgia

References

External links
WRIGHTSVILLE & TENNILLE RR Co. 1883-1903 Building Tennille Georgia, Wrightsville & Tennile Railroad Washington County GA.

Commercial buildings on the National Register of Historic Places in Georgia (U.S. state)
Commercial buildings completed in 1903
Buildings and structures in Washington County, Georgia